The Miaoli-class patrol vessel is a class of patrol vessels of the Coast Guard Administration of Taiwan.

Overview
The vessels are armed with 40mm guns and water cannons with an effective range of 120m.

History
The Taitung and Pingtung were commissioned on September 21, 2016, by Taiwanese President Tsai Ing-wen.

Vessels
 Miaoli CG131
 Taoyuan CG132
 Taitung CG133
 Pingtung CG135

See also
Chiayi-class patrol vessel
Anping-class offshore patrol vessel
Yilan-class patrol vessel

References

Ships built in the Republic of China
Patrol ship classes
Ships of the Coast Guard Administration